Wiedenborstel is a municipality in the district of Steinburg, in Schleswig-Holstein, Germany.

Geography
The village is located approximately 12 km north of Kellinghusen, and 10 km west of Neumünster, in the middle of Aukrug Nature Park. Hamburg is 75 km south.

Demographics
Wiedenborstel was the least populated municipality in Germany  with only eight inhabitants. All of the inhabitants belong to the same family. In 1910, Wiedenborstel had 119 inhabitants. Officially, by 31 December 2012, there were twelve inhabitants. It was no longer the least populous municipality in Germany, having lost that distinction to Gröde (with eleven inhabitants), and tied with Dierfeld (also with twelve). It was still the least densely populated municipality in Germany as of that date.

References

External links

 Official site of Amt Kellinghusen

Steinburg